1,2-Benzisoxazole is an aromatic organic compound with a molecular formula C7H5NO containing a benzene-fused isoxazole ring structure. The compound itself has no common applications; however, functionalized  benzisoxazoles and benzisoxazoyls have a variety of uses, including pharmaceutical drugs such as some antipsychotics (including risperidone, paliperidone, ocaperidone, and iloperidone) and the anticonvulsant zonisamide.

Its aromaticity makes it relatively stable; however, it is only weakly basic.

Synthesis
Benzisoxazole may be prepared from inexpensive salicylaldehyde, via a base catalyzed room temperature reaction with hydroxylamine-O-sulfonic acid.

Reactions

Kemp elimination
First reported by Daniel S. Kemp, the relatively weak N-O bond can be cleaved by a strong base to yield a 2-hydroxybenzonitrile species.

See also
Structural isomers
Benzoxazole
Anthranil

References 

Aromatic bases
 
Simple aromatic rings